The National Museum of the Faroe Islands is the national museum of the Faroe Islands, located in Tórshavn.

The Museum on Brekkutún 6 
The National Museum of the Faroe Islands has exhibitions in the museum building on Brekkutún 6 in Tórshavn. The galleries tell the natural and cultural history of the Faroe Islands. This goes back to the origin of the landmass dating back 65 mya, through the pre-settlement era and the culture etc. from the Viking Ages and the Middle Ages. Displays include rocks and minerals, birds, plants and fish, as well as items from the farming live and the maritime live in the Faroe Islands. The famous Kirkjubøstólarnir, which are parts of the original benches from the Ólavskirkjan (St. Olav's Church) of Kirkjubøur are amongst the most valued cultural items of the National Museum on Brekkutún 6. These were in Denmark for many years but have now returned to the Faroe Islands.

Heima á Garði in Hoyvík 
Heima á Garði is a farmhouse in Hoyvík, near Tórshavn. The farmhouse is now a part of the National Museum of the Faroe Islands. The main building was built around 1812, but it is furnished like Faroese houses were in 1920s. The museum is an outdoors museum with all the buildings and tools etc. which belonged to the farmhouse.

The pew ends
The medieval pew ends from Saint Olav's church at Kirkjubøur (mentioned above) featured in three series of Faroese stamps, engraved by Czeslaw Slania.

Faroese stamps 1980:

Faroese stamps 1984:

Faroese stamps 2001:

See also
 List of national museums
 National Archives of the Faroe Islands
 National Library of the Faroe Islands

References

External links 
tjodsavnid.fo (Official website of the National Museum of the Faroe Islands).

Museums in the Faroe Islands
Faroese culture
Tórshavn